The Athletics Competition at the 1951 Pan American Games was held in the Argentine capital, Buenos Aires. A total of 15 nations participated, with 243 athletes representing them in 33 athletics events.

Medal summary

Men's events

Women's events

 Hortensia López García finished 5th in the preliminary round and advanced to the final, winning the women's javelin throw with a distance of 39.45m. Her performance was challenged that same day by the Panama athletics delegation, which claimed that only the top 4 athletes should have advanced to the final instead of the top 6. García's finals  performance was briefly discounted, moving Judith Caballero of Panama up to the bronze medal position, but it was reinstated the next day. Some sources still list García's preliminary round mark of 32.68m as her final result.

Medal table

Participating nations

References

  .
 GBR Athletics: Pan American Games